The Big Bell Temple, or Da Zhong Temple, originally known as Jue Sheng Temple, is a Buddhist temple located on North 3rd Road in Beijing, China. 

The Big Bell Temple was built in 1733 during the reign of the Yongzheng Emperor of the Qing dynasty (1644-1911). The temple's name came after the famous "Yongle" Big Bell that is housed inside the temple, which was cast during the reign of the Yongle Emperor (1403-1424) of the Ming dynasty (1368-1644).  According to a test by the Chinese Academy of Sciences, the Yongle Big Bell's sound could reaches up to 120 decibels and can be heard 50 kilometers away from the temple in the depth of night. Many music experts, including some from the Chinese Acoustics Institute have found its tone pure, deep and melodious with a sprightly rhythm. Its frequency ranges from 22 to 800 hertz. 

According to about.com: 

The temple has housed a bell museum (Guzhong bowuguan; engl. Ancient Bell Museum) since 1985, featuring hundreds of bronze bells from temples throughout China.

Gallery

Footnotes

Buddhist temples in Beijing
Religious buildings and structures completed in 1733
Major National Historical and Cultural Sites in Beijing
1733 establishments in China